Tha Carter V is the twelfth studio album by American rapper Lil Wayne. It was released on September 28, 2018, by Young Money Entertainment and Republic Records. The album's features include Swizz Beatz, Kendrick Lamar, Sosamann, Lil Wayne's daughter Reginae Carter, Snoop Dogg, Nicki Minaj, Ashanti, Mack Maine, Travis Scott, Nivea and the late XXXTentacion.

Originally planned to be released in 2014, Tha Carter V experienced several delays as a result of contractual disputes between Lil Wayne and Cash Money Records, as well as his numerous personal disputes with label-head, Birdman. Following a lengthy legal battle, Lil Wayne was confirmed to have been released from his contract with Cash Money in June 2018 and announced the release of the album in September. The album received critical acclaim, and debuted at number one on the Billboard 200 with the second-largest streaming week for an album of all time and with 480,000 units sold.

On September 13, 2019, 20 songs from the original version of Tha Carter V were leaked online, containing many unreleased tracks compared to the official version of Carter V that was released in 2018.

A deluxe edition was released on September 25, 2020, to celebrate the album's two-year anniversary; it consists of songs that did not make the original album.

Background
In November 2012, Lil Wayne announced Tha Carter V would be his final album; he previously stated he would retire at the age of 35; he explained that he had four kids and he "would feel selfish still going to the studio when it's such a vital point in their lives". In April 2014, Wayne addressed his Carter V release: 

In May 2014, when asked about Tha Carter V, Lil Wayne said the album is all about "growth" and that his music is "supposed to be personal": 

In July 2014, in an interview with XXL, he spoke about the album, saying: 

In September 2019, 25 songs from the original version of Tha Carter V leaked.

Recording and production
In May 2014, Lil Wayne's longtime record producer, former Cash Money artist Mannie Fresh, announced he would be reuniting with Wayne on Tha Carter V. The collaboration marks the first time in 10 years that Fresh and Wayne worked together, not since 2004, when Wayne released Tha Carter and Fresh subsequently severed ties with the Cash Money Records. Also in May 2014, Atlanta-based rapper and producer Soulja Boy, who previously produced "Wowzerz" from I Am Not a Human Being II (2013) for Lil Wayne, announced he was working with Wayne on the fifth installment of Tha Carter series. In June 2014, Atlanta-based record producer Mike Will Made It, revealed "I got three records with Lil Wayne for Tha Carter V". In July 2014, Lil Wayne's frequent collaborator DVLP confirmed he had produced songs for Tha Carter V. While on the red carpet of the 2014 MTV Video Music Awards in California on August 24, West Coast hip hop producer DJ Mustard confirmed to MTV that Lil Wayne will be rapping over one of his beats on the album. In April 2016, New York-based record producer Myles William, revealed to the Arizona State Press, that he would produce a track for Tha Carter V.

A number of songs from Tha Carter V were recorded years before the album's release. "Mona Lisa" featuring Kendrick Lamar was recorded in 2014 and was intended to be on the 2014 release of the album. The song was teased after Martin Shkreli was able to acquire the project in 2016 and the song was played on livestream. The song "What About Me" originally featured Drake and was recorded in 2015. Post Malone was originally scheduled to be added to the song in the week before release, but didn't make to the album's initial release, possibly due to the verse not being finished. The song ended up with Sosamann on it, with the Post Malone version later being placed in the album's bonus tracks.

Tha Carter V was mastered by Colin Leonard at SING Mastering, and was mixed by Fabian Marasciullo.

Release and promotion
In July 2012, Lil Wayne said that the album would be released in 2013. On February 10, 2014, Lil Wayne's Young Money signee, Canadian recording artist Drake, tweeted "CARTER V". On October 18, 2013, Cash Money Records' Vice President of Promotion Mel Smith, tweeted: "Happy Friday!! New YMCMB music coming soon!! Carter 5." On February 15, 2014, during the NBA All-Star Weekend festivities at Sprite's NBA All-Star concert at the House of Blues in New Orleans, Lil Wayne appeared as a special guest during Drake's set and performed various hits. Wayne and Drake then broke the news that Tha Carter V was set to be released on May 5, 2014. On March 27, 2014, Wayne's manager Cortez Bryant announced that the album had been delayed.

On April 28, 2014, Los Angeles Lakers basketball player Kobe Bryant revealed what some speculated would be Tha Carter V album cover, via online photo-sharing and social networking service Instagram. Talking with ESPN, Wayne spoke about using athletes to promote the album, such as Kobe Bryant: "'Carter V Season' was all Kobe," Lil Wayne said when asked about Bryant's contribution. "He came up with it. I saw that and thought, 'That's dope as hell,' so that's what we're calling the [album] campaign. I thanked him. Then we thought about Floyd." In July 2014, in an interview with MTV News, Wayne spoke about when the album would be released, saying: "I'm so not good with that. I think it drops either in September and then we have...ah I can't tell you the sneak thing. Anyway, yeah, I think it drops in September or August."

From August to September 2014, Lil Wayne embarked on a concert tour alongside Drake, billed Drake vs. Lil Wayne. On August 14, 2014, Lil Wayne appeared on ESPN's First Take, where he unveiled the cover art for Tha Carter V, which features Wayne's mother: "It's perfect," Wayne said. "I always go with a baby picture. I wanted to go with one with my mama this time...To have my mom on there is more than an accomplishment. It's an achievement." During the ESPN interview, Wayne also announced that the album would be released on October 28, 2014. On October 28, 2014, Wayne released a Public Service Announcement (PSA), where he revealed the album had been delayed due to the album's tentative track list having over 31 songs. During the PSA, he stated that he worked too hard and refuses to cheat his fans and himself, therefore he came up with a way to give his fans every song he has recorded for the album, announcing: "the first part of the Carter V album will be dropping December 9. Stay tuned for the next part of the album".

On December 4, 2014, just five days before the album was due to be released, Wayne issued a statement saying the album would not be released on its expected release date, due to his displeasure with Cash Money Records label-boss Birdman not wanting to release the album although it had been completed. Wayne also expressed his feelings by stating he felt both he and his creativity were being held "prisoner". On January 20, 2015, Wayne self-released Sorry 4 the Wait 2, a mixtape to compensate for the continued delay of Tha Carter V. It is the sequel to 2011's Sorry 4 the Wait, which served the same purpose during the delay of his ninth album, Tha Carter IV (2011). Upon Sorry for the Wait 2s release, it was noted Wayne disses Birdman and Cash Money Records several times throughout the mixtape. Birdman was reported to be upset with this.

Despite his legal battle with Cash Money, during the time when the album was in flux, Lil Wayne claimed to have authority over when and how the album got released. He spoke in an interview at the time, stating: "Of course you're going to see Tha Carter V. I just don't want to put it out the wrong way. Honestly, I can do what I want at any time. The fans deserve it to be right and that's how it's gonna be. I'ma make sure it's right. I can drop whatever I want to drop. That's why I keep dropping whatever I want to drop. But I'm not gonna give them Carter V the wrong way."

Wayne appeared on The Tonight Show Starring Jimmy Fallon, and played the song "Dedicate".

On November 10, 2018, Wayne released 3 additional songs, "What About Me (feat. Post Malone)," "Hasta La Vista," and "In This House (featuring Gucci Mane)."

On November 10, 2018, Lil Wayne performed two songs, "Can't Be Broken" with surprise guest Halsey and "Uproar" with Swizz Beatz, from the album on Saturday Night Live.
On December 13, 2018 Lil Wayne performed Don't Cry on Late Show with Stephen Colbert and paid homage to rapper XXXTentacion.

Critical reception

Tha Carter V received generally favourable reviews from critics, with many considering it to be his best album since Tha Carter III but criticizing its length. At Metacritic, which assigns a normalized rating out of 100 to reviews from mainstream publications, the album received an average score of 72, based on fourteen reviews. A.D. Amorosi of Variety gave a very positive review, writing, "Musically, despite the age of some of the songs, V is fresh, flush and even frenetic at times, with the crunch of the Southern trap and ropey rap-rock sounds that Wayne pretty much started in the first place." Evan Rytlewski of Pitchfork said, "The long-delayed album captures Wayne how we want to remember him: openhearted, word-drunk, and exhilarated by the possibilities of his own versatility", and that "the most surprising takeaway from Tha Carter V, it turns out, isn't that Wayne still has music this vital in him. It's that after all these years, there's still more to learn about him." Hanif Abdurraqib of Entertainment Weekly said, "Wayne is, by nature, an exciting rapper. His breathless, consistently accelerating flow is still present here, though not varied enough to work as well as it once did back in the day." Mitch Findlay of HotNewHipHop said, "Tha Carter V seemed destined for anticlimax. Luckily, Weezy made sure to revisit his project with modern sensibilities, imbuing the album with a sense of wisdom he may not possessed upon its initial conception. As a result, Tha Carter V feels insightful enough to appease those seeking something new from Wayne, while staying familiar enough for the ones who simply missed the flourishment of rap's elder statesman." Mosi Reeves from Rolling Stone said, "It's an album full of poignant bars, fire, and passion from an artist who doesn't have anything left to prove", and that "Tha Carter V can't compare to the first three point five Carter installments, or his epochal 2005–2007 mixtape run. But it doesn't need to." Thomas Hobbs from Highsnobiety said, “It might not be the best in the Carter series, but it's potentially the most important, paving the way for a new chapter in Weezy's career where more philosophical lyricism should allow him to transition into the role of a rap elder statesman, a lot like JAY-Z did with 4:44. Tha Carter V is a testament to the notion that when its creator is feeling up to the task, he has the look and feel of one of the greats.” The staff of XXL magazine said, "The album is indeed, as much for the journey that led to its release as the previously unseen layers that Weezy reveals." Erin Hannon from Exclaim! said, "Relationships with women are at the forefront of Tha Carter V, including a desperate cry for help from his mother on "I Love You Dwayne," which leads into the sorrowful "Don't Cry," featuring a chorus from the late XXXTENTACION. ... Despite the revelations, the album is not without its expected bangers." Andy Kellman of AllMusic said, "Almost 90 minutes in length, it's pieced together with material recorded from years to weeks ahead of release, and one cut goes back to resemble an early-2000s crossover bid, from its smoothly melodic Mannie Fresh production to its Ashanti hook. A greater portion forms a sluggish, indistinct mass... For all the excess and buildup, this exhibits Wayne on an upswing, lucid and invigorated."

However, Jordan Bassett of NME gave the album a more mixed review, stating that "It could have been his emotional swansong, and much of this long-delayed album is an elegiac homage to Lil Wayne's outlier status as an elder statesman of hip-hop. Sadly, he cheapens himself on Tha Carter V", later clarifying the reason as 'misogyny'". Jon Sorentino Caramanica from The New York Times said, "Excess bravado was always a part of his proposition, but this album drags and seeps, with long stretches of shrugs in between moments of invention." Lil Wayne can still spew bars with dizzying dexterity, but his self-editing isn't great; there are terrific beats (Uproar) and lame ones (Took His Time). Mona Lisa is a piece of storytelling noir in which Wayne goes head-to-head with Kendrick Lamar, and does not come out lacking. It's not that C5 is too little, too late; more that the baton between the generations passed some time ago.

Accolades

Commercial performance
Tha Carter V debuted at number one on the US Billboard 200 with 480,000 album-equivalent units, including 140,000 pure album sales. It had the second-largest streaming week for an album with 433 million streams. Upon release of the album, Lil Wayne became the first artist to debut 2 songs in the top 5 of the Billboard Hot 100. The record is also Lil Wayne's fourth US number-one album. It is his third album to top Canadian Albums Chart, opening at number one there with 24,000 consumption units. As of November 18, 2018, Tha Carter V has sold one million album-equivalent units in the United States.

The album debuted at number 5 on the UK Albums Chart, giving Wayne his highest-charting album in the United Kingdom.

After the album's release on September 28, one of its hit singles, "Uproar", had sparked a viral dance challenge shortly after. Notable celebrities and Internet stars had participated in this challenge, such as Diddy, Swizz Beatz, Shiggy, and Lil Wayne's daughter, Reginae Carter.

Track listing
Credits adapted from Tidal, ASCAP and BMI.

Notes
 signifies a co-producer
 signifies an additional producer
 "I Love You Dwayne" features vocals by Jacida Carter, Lil Wayne's mother
 "Can't Be Broken" features uncredited vocals by Thomas Troelsen.
 "Hittas" features uncredited vocals by Drake
And a sample from Boosie BadAzz
, “Jealousy”

 The Deluxe Edition begins with tracks 27 through 33, then tracks 24 through 26 and lastly contains the original 23 tracks of Tha Carter V

Samples
 "Dedicate" contains a sample from a 2009 speech by Barack Obama, and "Dedication" written by Tauheed Epps, Joshua Luellen and Michael Dean, performed by 2 Chainz
 "Uproar" contains a sample of "Special Delivery", performed by G. Dep and P. Diddy
 “Dope Niggaz” contains a sample of "Xxplosive", written by Dr. Dre, Nate Dogg and Kurupt, performed by Hittman, Kurupt, Nate Dogg and Six-Two
 "Let It All Work Out" contains a sample of "Indecision", written and performed by Sampha

Personnel
Credits adapted from Tidal.

Performance
 Lil Wayne – main artist
 XXXTentacion – featured artist 
 Swizz Beatz – featured artist 
 Travis Scott – featured artist 
 Nicki Minaj – featured artist 
 Kendrick Lamar – featured artist 
 Sosamann – featured artist 
 Reginae Carter – featured artist 
 Snoop Dogg – featured artist 
 Ashanti – featured artist 
 Mack Maine – featured artist 
 Nivea – featured artist 
 Post Malone – featured artist 
 Gucci Mane – featured artist 
 Jacida Carter – vocals 
 Thomas Troelsen – vocals 
 Anita Faye Wilson – vocals 
 Drake – uncredited vocals 
 Betty Wright – background vocals 

Instrumentation
 Jonah Christian – keyboards , organs 
 Keith Cooper – clarinet , flute 
 Kev Marcus – violin 
 Wilner Baptiste – viola 
 Frank E – drums 
 Johnny Yukon – bass , drums , electric bass , keyboards , synthesizers 
 Jonathan Buice – keyboards 

Production
 Lil Wayne – executive production
 Ben Billions – production 
 Z3N – production 
 Louie Haze – production 
 Manny Galvez – production 
 Roc & Mayne – production 
 Avenue – production 
 Swizz Beatz – production 
 DrtWrk – production 
 Sevn Thomas – production 
 Thomas Troelsen – production 
 Jonah Christian – production 
 Bloque – production 
 Infamous – production , additional production 
 DJ Frank E – production 
 Johnny Yukon – production 
 ACE – production 
 Sak Pase – production 
 Zaytoven – production 
 R!o – production 
 Jayones – production 
 Fatboymixx – production 
 FreeWayTJay – production 
 DJ Mustard – production 
 Mike Free – production 
 Mannie Fresh – production 
 808-Ray – production 
 Cool & Dre – production 
 Metro Boomin – production 
 Jordan – production 
 Myles William – production 
 Reefa – production 
 Onhel – production 
 Tay Keith – production 
 Frank E – additional production 
 Nick The Piff – additional production 
 John Cunningham – vocal production 
 Kamo – co-production 
 Prince 85 – co-production 

Technical
 Fabian Marasciullo – mixing 
 McCoy Socalgargoyle – mixing assistance 
 Manny Galvez – recording 
 Matthew Testa – recording 
 Big Juice – recording 
 Angel Aponte – recording 
 MixedByAli – recording 
 Omar Loya – recording 
 Jeff Edwards – recording 
 Louis Bell – recording 
 John Kercy – recording 
 Javier Valverde – recording 
 Steve Valdez – recording 
 Jason Delattiboudere – recording assistance 
 Sam Allison – recording assistance 
 Manny Park – recording assistance 
 Jeffrey Tanner – recording assistance 
 Carlos A. Molina – recording assistance 
 Brian Judd – recording assistance 
 Andy Rodriguez – recording assistance 

Notes
 "What About Me", "In This House", and "Hasta La Vista" are credited as tracks 24, 25, 26, respectively.

Charts

Weekly charts

Year-end charts

Decade-end charts

Certifications

References

2018 albums
Lil Wayne albums
Young Money Entertainment albums
Albums produced by Cool & Dre
Albums produced by DJ Mustard
Albums produced by Mannie Fresh
Albums produced by Metro Boomin
Albums produced by Swizz Beatz
Albums produced by Zaytoven
Albums produced by Mike Free
Albums produced by Reefa
Albums produced by Tay Keith
Albums produced by Thomas Troelsen
Sequel albums